Syrianarpia kasyi is a species of moth in the family Crambidae described by Patrice J.A. Leraut in 1984. It is found in Iran.

References

Moths described in 1984
Scopariinae